Yelaung may refer to several villages in Burma:

Yelaung, Amarapura
Yelaung, Hsawlaw